Kiss Me Monster is a 1967 adventure mystery film directed, written and co-starring Jesús Franco. Other principal cast include Janine Reynaud, Rosanna Yanni, Chris Howland, Michel Lemoine, Manuel Velasco, Ana Casares, Adrian Hoven and Barta Barri. It premiered in Austria on May 31, 1969, and was shown in the US in November 1972.

Cast
 Janine Reynaud - Diana (as Janine Renaud)
 Rosanna Yanni - Regina (as Rossana Yanni)
 Chris Howland - Francis McClune
 Michel Lemoine - Jacques Maurier
 Manuel Velasco - Andy (as Manolo Velasco)
 Manolo Otero - Dimitri (as Manuel Otero)
 Ana Casares - Linda
 Adrian Hoven - Eric Vicas
 Marta Reves - Irina
 Barta Barri - Inspector Kramer
 María Antonia Redondo - Bulumba
 Jesús Franco - Abilene's Contact Man
 Dorit Dom - Anita (as Maria Dom)

References

External links
 
 

1960s German-language films
1967 films
1960s adventure films
1960s mystery films
Spanish adventure drama films
German adventure drama films
Films shot in Spain
Films directed by Jesús Franco
1960s German films